The XVI Memorial of Hubert Jerzy Wagner was a volleyball tournament held at Tauron Arena in Kraków, Poland from 24 to 26 August 2018. Like the previous edition, 4 teams participated in the tournament, but first time in the history, it was the same teams second time in the row.

Qualification
All teams except the host must have received an invitation from the organizers.

Squads

Venue

Results
All times are Central European Summer Time (UTC+02:00).

|}

|}

Final standing

Awards

Most Valuable Player
  Artur Szalpuk
Best Setter
  Jay Blankenau
Best Server
  Piotr Nowakowski
Best Receiver
  Dmitry Volkov

Best Blocker
  Jakub Kochanowski
Best Opposite Spiker
  Jean Patry
Best Libero
  Jenia Grebennikov

References

External links
Official website

Memorial of Hubert Jerzy Wagner
Sports competitions in Kraków
Memorial of Hubert Jerzy Wagner
Memorial of Hubert Jerzy Wagner
Memorial of Hubert Jerzy Wagner
21st century in Kraków